Xiangtan Sports Centre Stadium (Simplified Chinese: 湘潭体育中心) is a multi-use stadium in Xiangtan, People's Republic of China.  It is currently used mostly for football matches.  The stadium holds 30,000 people.

Footnotes

Football venues in China
Sports venues in Hunan